Darjak (also known as Darjag) is a village in Bondar Rural District, Senderk District, Minab County, Hormozgan Province, Iran. At the 2006 census, its population was 266, in 62 families.

References 

Populated places in Minab County